The Los Angeles Common Council was the predecessor of the Los Angeles, California, City Council. It was formed in 1850 under state law, when the city had only 1,610 residents, and it existed until 1889, when the city had about 50,400 residents and a city charter was put into effect.

From 1850 through 1869, council members were elected at large under a first-past-the-post voting system, in which the top vote-getters were seated. From 1870 they were elected by electoral districts called wards.

History 

The Los Angeles Common Council was created in 1850 as the city of Los Angeles grew from a remote town of 5,000 residents to a city of 15,000 residents. Between its creation in 1850 to 1858, the council had 7 seats and for two years after had 10 seats drawn by lots. From 1870 to 1889, the council had a ward system with three (until 1877) and five (1877 onwards) seats.

The Council had various responsibilities for governing the city, including the responsibility of governing the school system as several members were appointed to serve on a committee for the governance of schools.

In 1857, the officials that were elected on May 6 were deposed and the officials from the previous year were reinstated, though they never took office.<ref>Chronological Record of Los Angeles City Officials,1850-1938, 1867-1868 section, page 1, second iteration</ref>

Members
 At-large (1850–1870) 

Wards (1870–1889)

See also

 Los Angeles City Council, 1889–1909
 Los Angeles City Council

References

Notes
 Except for the population figures (see below), all data is from Chronological Record of Los Angeles City Officials,1850-1938,'' compiled under direction of Municipal Reference Library, City Hall, Los Angeles (March 1938, reprinted 1966). "Prepared ... as a report on Project No. SA 3123-5703-6077-8121-9900 conducted under the auspices of the Works Progress Administration."
Population figures are from 

 01
 01
California city councils
.Common Council
19th century in Los Angeles
People in 19th-century California
1850s in California
1860s in California
1870s in California
1880s in California
1850 establishments in California
1889 disestablishments in California
Government agencies established in 1850
Government agencies disestablished in 1889